Zoning is a method of urban planning in which a municipality or other tier of government divides land into areas called zones, each of which has a set of regulations for new development that differs from other zones. Zones may be defined for a single use (e.g. residential, industrial), they may combine several compatible activities by use, or in the case of form-based zoning, the differing regulations may govern the density, size and shape of allowed buildings whatever their use. The planning rules for each zone determine whether planning permission for a given development may be granted. Zoning may specify a variety of outright and conditional uses of land. It may indicate the size and dimensions of lots that land may be subdivided into, or the form and scale of buildings. These guidelines are set in order to guide urban growth and development.

Zoning is the most common regulatory urban planning method used by local governments in developed countries. Exceptions include the United Kingdom and the City of Houston, Texas. Zoning laws that limit the construction of new housing (like single-family zoning) are associated with reduced affordability and are a major factor in residential segregation in the United States by income and race.

Scope
The primary purpose of zoning is to segregate uses that are thought to be incompatible. In practice, zoning is also used to prevent new development from interfering with existing uses and/or to preserve the "character" of a community.

Zoning may include regulation of the kinds of activities which will be acceptable on particular lots (such as open space, residential, agricultural, commercial or industrial), the densities at which those activities can be performed (from low-density housing such as single family homes to high-density such as high-rise apartment buildings), the height of buildings, the amount of space structures may occupy, the location of a building on the lot (setbacks), the proportions of the types of space on a lot, such as how much landscaped space, impervious surface, traffic lanes, and whether or not parking is provided.

Zoning is commonly controlled by local governments such as counties or municipalities, though the nature of the zoning regime may be determined or limited by state or national planning authorities or through enabling legislation. In some countries, e. g. France, Germany or Canada, zoning plans must comply with upper-tier (national, regional, state, provincial) planning and policy statements. In the case of Germany this code includes contents of zoning plans as well as the legal procedure. In Australia, land under the control of the Commonwealth (federal) government is not subject to state planning controls. The United States and other federal countries are similar. Zoning and urban planning in France and Germany are regulated by national or federal codes. In the case of Germany this code includes contents of zoning plans as well as the legal procedure.

The details of how individual planning systems incorporate zoning into their regulatory regimes varies though the intention is always similar. For example, in the state of Victoria, Australia, land use zones are combined with a system of planning scheme overlays to account for the multiplicity of factors that impact on desirable urban outcomes in any location.

Most zoning systems have a procedure for granting variances (exceptions to the zoning rules), usually because of some perceived hardship caused by the particular nature of the property in question.

Origins and history of zoning 
The origins of zoning districts can be traced back to antiquity. The ancient walled city was the predecessor for classifying and regulating land, based on use. Outside the city walls were the undesirable functions, which were usually based on noise and smell; that was also where the poorest people lived. The space between the walls is where unsanitary and dangerous activities occurred such as butchering, waste disposal, and brick-firing. Within the walls were civic and religious places, and where the majority of people lived.

Beyond distinguishing between urban and non-urban land, most ancient cities further classified land types and uses inside their walls. This was practiced in many regions of the world – for example, in China during the Zhou Dynasty (1046 – 256 BC), in India during the Vedic Era (1500 – 500 BC), and in the military camps that spread throughout the Roman Empire (31 BC – 476 AD). Because residential districts made up the majority of cities, early forms of districting were usually along ethnic and occupational divides; generally, class or status diminished from the city centre outward. One legal form of enforcing this was the caste system.

While space was carved out for important public institutions, places of worship, retail stores, markets and squares, there is one major distinction between cities of antiquity and today. Throughout antiquity, up until the onset of the Industrial Revolution (1760–1840), most work took place within the home. Therefore, residential areas also functioned as places of labor, production, and commerce. The definition of home was tied to the definition of economy, which caused a much greater mixing of uses within the residential quarters of cities.

Throughout the Enlightenment and Industrial Revolution, cultural and socio-economic shifts led to the rapid increase in the enforcement and invention of urban regulations. The shifts were informed by a new scientific rationality, the advent of mass production and complex manufacturing, and the subsequent onset of urbanization. Industry leaving the home reshaped modern cities.

Overcrowding, pollution, and the urban squalor associated with factories were major concerns that led city officials and planners to consider the need for functional separation of uses. France, Germany, and Britain are where pseudo-zoning was invented to prevent polluting industries to be built in residential areas. Early uses of modern zoning were seen in Germany in the late-19th century.

Types 
There are a great variety of zoning types, some of which focus on regulating building form and the relation of buildings to the street with mixed uses, known as form-based, others with separating land uses, known as use-based, or a combination thereof. Use-based zoning systems can comprise single-use zones, mixed-use zones - where a compatible group of uses are allowed to co-exist - or a combination of both single and mixed-use zones in one system.

Single-use zoning

Single-use zoning is where only one kind of use is allowed per zone. Known as Euclidean zoning in North America because of a court case in Euclid, Ohio, which established its constitutionality, Village of Euclid, Ohio v.

Commonly defined single-use zones include: residential, mixed residential-commercial, commercial, industrial and spatial (e. g. power plants, sports
complexes, airports, shopping malls etc.). Each category can have a number of sub-categories, for example, within the commercial category there may be separate zones for small-retail, large retail, office use, lodging and others, while industrial may be subdivided into heavy manufacturing, light assembly and warehouse uses. In Germany, each category has a designated limit for noise emissions (not part of the building code, but federal emissions code).

In the United States or Canada, for example, residential zones can have the following sub-categories:
 Residential occupancies containing sleeping units where the occupants are primarily transient in nature, including: boarding houses, hotels, motels.
 Residential occupancies containing sleeping units or more than two dwelling units where the occupants are primarily permanent in nature, including: apartment houses, convents, dormitories.
 Residential occupancies where the occupants are primarily permanent in nature and not classified as Group R-1, R-2, R-4 or I, including: buildings that do not contain more than two dwelling units, adult care facilities for five or fewer persons for less than 24 hours.
 Residential occupancies where the buildings are arranged for occupancy as residential care/assisted living facilities including more than five but not more than 16 occupants.

History
Separation between uses is a feature of many planned cities designed before the advent of zoning. A notable example is Adelaide in South Australia, whose city centre, along with the suburb of North Adelaide, is surrounded on all sides by a park, the Adelaide Park Lands. The park was designed by Colonel William Light in 1836 in order to physically separate the city centre from its suburbs. Low density residential areas surround the park, providing a pleasant walk between work in the city within and the family homes outside.

Sir Ebenezer Howard, founder of the garden city movement, cited Adelaide as an example of how green open space could be used to prevent cities from expanding beyond their boundaries and coalescing. His design for an ideal city, published in his 1902 book Garden Cities of To-morrow, envisaged separate concentric rings of public buildings, parks, retail space, residential areas and industrial areas, all surrounded by open space and farmland. All retail activity was to be conducted within a single glass-roofed building, an early concept for the modern shopping centre inspired by the Crystal Palace. 

However, these planned or ideal cities were static designs embodied in a single masterplan. What was lacking was a regulatory mechanism to allow the city to develop over time, setting guidelines to developers and private citizens over what could be built where. This came in 1916, when New York City enacted the first city-wide zoning ordinance.

The application of single-use zoning has led to the distinctive form of many cities in the United States, Canada, Australia and New Zealand, in which a very dense urban core, often containing skyscrapers, is surrounded by low density residential suburbs, characterised by large gardens and leafy streets. Some metropolitan areas such as Minneapolis–St Paul, the San Francisco Bay Area, and Sydney have several such cores.

Mixed-use zoning

Planning and community activist Jane Jacobs wrote extensively on the connections between the separation of uses and the failure of urban renewal projects in New York City. She advocated dense mixed use developments and walkable streets. In contrast to villages and towns, in which many residents know one another, and low-density outer suburbs that attract few visitors, cities and inner city areas have the problem of maintaining order between strangers. This order is maintained when, throughout the day and evening, there are sufficient people present with eyes on the street . This can be accomplished in successful urban districts that have a great diversity of uses, creating interest and attracting visitors.  Jacob's writings, along with increasing concerns about urban sprawl, are often credited with inspiring the New Urbanism movement.

To accommodate the New Urbanist vision of walkable communities combining cafés, restaurants, offices and residential development in a single area, mixed-use zones have been created within some zoning systems. These still use the basic regulatory mechanisms of zoning, excluding incompatible uses such as heavy industry or sewage farms, while allowing compatible uses such as residential, commercial and retail activities so that people can live, work and socialise within a compact geographic area.

Examples include:
 Melbourne, Victoria, Australia
 Baltimore, Maryland Baltimore, MD City Code, Art. 32 § 6-201 (2017).
 Saint Anthony, Idaho St. Anthony, ID Municipal Code §§ 17.06.090-17.06.120

Form-based zoning

Form-based zoning regulates not the type of land use, but the form that land use may take. For instance, form-based zoning in a dense area may insist on low setbacks, high density, and pedestrian accessibility. Form-based codes (FBCs) are designed to directly respond to the physical structure of a community in order to create more walkable and adaptable environments.

New York's 1916 Zoning Resolution also contained elements of form-based zoning. This was a reaction to The Equitable Building which towered over the neighbouring residences, diminishing the availability of sunshine.  It mandated setbacks to tall buildings involving a mathematical formula based on the height and lot size, and led to the iconic shapes of many early skyscrapers. New York City went on to develop ever more complex regulations, including floor-area ratio regulations, air rights and others for specific neighborhoods.

The French planning system is mostly form-based; zoning codes in French cities generally allow many types of uses. The key differences between zones are based on the density of each use on a site. For example, a low-density zone may have the same permissible uses as a high-density zone. However, the proportion of residential uses in the low-density zone would be greater than in the high-density zone for economic rather than regulatory reasons.

The city of Paris has used its zoning system to concentrate high density office buildings in the district of La Défense rather than allow heritage buildings across the city to be demolished to make way for them, as is often the case in London or New York. The construction of the Montparnasse Tower in 1973 led to an outcry. As a result, two years after its completion the construction of buildings over seven storeys high in the city centre was banned.

Conditional zoning
Conditional zoning allows for increased flexibility and permits municipalities to respond to the unique features of a particular land use application. Uses which might be disallowed under current zoning, such as a school or a community center can be permitted via conditional use zoning.
Conditional use permits (also called special use permits) enable land uses that because of their special nature may be suitable only in certain locations, or arranged or operated in a particular manner.

For example:
 Local agencies can restrict the time, place and manner in which convenience stores, liquor stores and fast-food outlets operate.
 Community gardens can be allowed under specified conditions in certain zones.
 As a condition of approval, large mixed-use development projects can be encouraged or required to offer to lease commercial space for a grocery store in a neighborhood that lacks access to healthy foods.

Pattern zoning 
Pattern zoning is a zoning technique in which a municipality provides licensed pre-approved building designs, typically with an expedited permitting process. Pattern zoning is used to reduce barriers to housing development, create more affordable housing, reduce burdens on permit-review staff, and create quality housing designs within a certain neighborhood or jurisdiction. Pattern zoning may also be used to promote certain building types such as missing middle housing and affordable small-scale commercial properties. In some cases, a municipality purchases design patterns and constructs the properties themselves while in other cases the municipality offers the patterns for private development.

By country

Australia

The legal framework for land use zoning in Australia is established by States and Territories, hence each State or Territory has different zoning rules. Land use zones are generally defined at local government level, and most often called Planning Schemes. In reality, however in all cases the state governments have an absolute ability to overrule the local decision-making. There are administrative appeal processes such as VCAT to challenge decisions.

Statutory planning, otherwise known as town planning, development control or development management, refers to the part of the planning process that is concerned with the regulation and management of changes to land use and development. Planning and zoning have a great political dimension, with governments often criticized for favouring developers; also nimbyism is very prevalent.

Canada

In Canada, land-use control is a provincial responsibility deriving from the constitutional authority over property and civil rights. This authority had been granted to the provinces under the British North America Acts of 1867 and was carried forward in the Constitution Act, 1982. The zoning power relates to real property, or land and the improvements constructed thereon that become part of the land itself (in Québec, immeubles). The provinces empowered the municipalities and regions to control the use of land within their boundaries, letting the municipalities establish their own zoning by-laws. There are provisions for control of land use in unorganized areas of the provinces. Provincial tribunals are the ultimate authority for appeals and reviews.

France 

In France, the Code of Urbanism or Code de l’urbanisme (called the Town Planning Code )a national law, guides regional and local planning and outlines procedures for obtaining building permits. Unlike England where planners must use their discretion to allow use or building type changes, private development in France is permitted as long as the developer follows the legally-binding regulations.

Japan 
Zoning districts are classified into twelve use zones. Each zone determines a building's shape and permitted uses. A building's shape is controlled by zonal restrictions on allowable floor area ratio and height (in absolute terms and in relation with adjacent buildings and roads). These controls are intended to allow adequate light and ventilation between buildings and on roads. Instead of single-use zoning, zones are defined by the "most intense" use permitted. Uses of lesser intensity are permitted in zones where higher intensity uses are permitted but higher intensity uses are not allowed in lower intensity zones.

New Zealand

New Zealand's planning system is grounded in effects-based Performance Zoning under the Resource Management Act.

Philippines
Zoning and land use planning in the Philippines is governed by the Department of Human Settlements and Urban Development (DHSUD) and previously by the Housing and Land Use Regulatory Board (HLURB), which lays out national zoning guidelines and regulations, and oversees the preparation and implementation of comprehensive land use plans (CLUPs) and zoning ordinances by city and municipal governments under their mandate in the Local Government Code of 1991 (Republic Act No. 7160).

The present zoning scheme used in the Philippines is detailed in the HLURB's Model Zoning Ordinance published in 2014, which outlines 26 basic zone types based on primary usage and building regulations (as defined in the National Building Code), and also includes public domain and water bodies within the municipality's jurisdiction. Local governments may also add overlays identifying special use zones such as areas prone to natural disasters, ancestral lands of indigenous peoples (IPs), heritage zones, ecotourism areas, transit-oriented developments (TODs), and scenic corridors. Residential and commercial zones are further subdivided into subclasses defined by density, commercial zones also allow for residential uses, and industrial zones are subdivided by their intensity and the environmental impact of the uses allowed.  Regulations on residential, commercial, and industrial zones may differ between municipalities, so one municipality may permit 4-storey buildings on medium-density residential zones, while another may only permit 2-storey buildings.

Singapore

The framework for governing land uses in Singapore is administered by the Urban Redevelopment Authority (URA) through the Master Plan. The Master Plan is a statutory document divided into two sections: the plans and the Written Statement. The plans show the land use zoning allowed across Singapore, while the Written Statement provides a written explanation of the zones available and their allowed uses.

United Kingdom

The United Kingdom does not use zoning as a technique for controlling land use. British land use control began its modern phase after the Town and Country Planning Act of 1947. Rather than dividing municipal maps into land use zones, English planning law places all development under the control of local and regional governments, effectively abolishing the ability to develop land by-right. However, existing development allows land use by-right as long as the use does not constitute a change in the type of land use. A property owner must apply to change land use type of any existing building, and such changes must be consistent with the local and regional land use plans.

Development control or planning control is the element of the United Kingdom's system of town and country planning through which local government regulates land use and new building. There are 421 Local Planning Authorities (LPAs) in the United Kingdom. Generally they are the local borough or district council or a unitary authority. They each use a discretionary "plan-led system" whereby development plans are formed and the public consulted. Subsequent development requires planning permission, which will be granted or refused with reference to the development plan as a material consideration.

The plan does not provide specific guidance on what type of buildings will be allowed in a given location, rather it provides general principles for development and goals for the management of urban change. Because planning committees (made up of directly elected local councillors) or in some cases planning officers themselves (via delegated decisions) have discretion on each application for development or change of use made, the system is considered a 'discretionary' one.

Planning applications can differ greatly in scale, from airports and new towns to minor modifications to individual houses. In order to prevent local authorities from being overwhelmed by high volumes of small-scale applications from individual householders, a separate system of permitted development has been introduced. Permitted development rules are largely form-based, but in the absence of zoning, are applied at the national level. Examples include allowing a two-storey extension up to three metres at the rear of a property, extensions up to 50% of the original width at each side, and certain types of outbuildings in the garden, provided that no more than 50% of the land area is built over. These are appropriately sized for a typical three bedroom semi-detached property, but must be applied across a wide variety of housing types, from small terraces, to larger detached properties and manor houses.

In August 2020, the UK Government published a consultation document called Planning for the Future. The proposals hint at a move toward zoning, with areas given a Growth, Renewal or Protected designation, with the possibility of "sub-areas within each category", although the document doesn't elaborate on what the details of these might be.

United States

Under the police power rights, state governments may exercise over private real property. With this power, special laws and regulations have long been made restricting the places where particular types of business can be carried on. In 1904, Los Angeles established the nation's first land-use restrictions for a portion of the city. New York City adopted the first zoning regulations to apply city-wide in 1916.

The constitutionality of zoning ordinances was upheld by the U.S. Supreme Court in the 1926 case Village of Euclid, Ohio v. Ambler Realty Co. Among large populated cities in the United States, Houston is unique in having no zoning ordinances. Rather, land use is regulated by other means.

Scale
Early zoning practices were subtle and often debated. Some claim the practices started in the 1920s while others suggest the birth of zoning occurred in New York in 1916. Both of these examples for the start of zoning, however, were urban cases. Zoning becomes an increasing legal force as it continues to expand in its geographical range through its introduction in other urban centres and use in larger political and geographical boundaries. Regional zoning was the next step in increased geographical size of areas under zoning laws. A major difference between urban zoning and regional zoning was that "regional areas consequently seldom bear direct relationship to arbitrary political boundaries". This form of zoning also included rural areas which was counter-intuitive to the theory that zoning was a result of population density. Finally, zoning also expanded again but back to a political boundary again with state zoning.

Types in use in the United States
Zoning codes have evolved over the years as urban planning theory has changed, legal constraints have fluctuated, and political priorities have shifted. The various approaches to zoning can be divided into four broad categories: Euclidean, Performance, Incentive, and form-based.

Named for the type of zoning code adopted in the town of Euclid, Ohio, and approved in a landmark decision of the U.S. Supreme Court, Village of Euclid v. Ambler Realty Co. Euclidean zoning codes are the most prevalent in the United States. Euclidean zoning is characterized by the segregation of land uses into specified geographic districts and dimensional standards stipulating limitations on development activity within each type of district. Advantages include relative effectiveness, ease of implementation, long-established legal precedent, and familiarity. However, Euclidean zoning has received criticism for its lack of flexibility and institutionalization of now-outdated planning theory.

Also known as "effects-based planning", performance zoning uses performance-based or goal-oriented criteria to establish review parameters for proposed development projects. Performance zoning is intended to provide flexibility, rationality, transparency and accountability, avoiding the arbitrariness of the Euclidean approach and better accommodating market principles and private property rights with environmental protection. Difficulties included a requirement for a high level of discretionary activity on the part of the supervising authority. Performance zoning has not been widely adopted in the USA.

First implemented in Chicago and New York City, incentive zoning is intended to provide a reward-based system to encourage development that meets established urban development goals.  Typically, the method establishes a base level of limitations and a reward scale to entice developers to incorporate the desired development criteria.
Incentive zoning allows a high degree of flexibility, but can be complex to administer.

Form-based codes offer considerably more governmental latitude in building uses and form than do Euclidean codes. Form-based zoning regulates not the type of land use, but the form that land use may take. For instance, form-based zoning in a dense area may insist on low setbacks, high density, and pedestrian accessibility. FBCs are designed to directly respond to the physical structure of a community in order to create more walkable and adaptable environments.

Social problems in the United States
The United States suffers from greater levels of deurbanization and urban decay than other developed countries, and additional problems such as urban prairies that do not occur elsewhere. Jonathan Rothwell has argued that zoning encourages racial segregation. He claims a strong relationship exists between an area's allowance of building housing at higher density and racial integration between blacks and whites in the United States. The relationship between segregation and density is explained by Rothwell and Massey as the restrictive density zoning producing higher housing prices in white areas and limiting opportunities for people with modest incomes to leave segregated areas. Between 1980 and 2000, racial integration occurred faster in areas that did not have strict density regulations than those that did. Rothwell and Massey suggest homeowners and business interests are the two key players in density regulations that emerge from a political economy. They propose that in older states where rural jurisdictions are primarily composed of homeowners, it is the narrow interests of homeowners to block development because tax rates are lower in rural areas, and taxation is more likely to fall on the median homeowner. Business interests are unable to counteract the homeowners' interests in rural areas because business interests are weaker and business ownership is rarely controlled by people living outside the community. This translates into rural communities that have a tendency to resist development by using density regulations to make business opportunities less attractive. Density zoning regulations in the U.S increase residential segregation in metropolitan areas by reducing the availability of affordable housing in some jurisdictions; other zoning regulations like school infrastructure regulations and growth controls are also variables associated with higher segregation. With more permissive zoning regulations there are lower levels of segregation; desegregation is higher in places with more liberal regulations on zoning, allowing the residents to integrate racially. Metropolitan areas that allowed higher density development moved rapidly toward racial integration than their counterparts with strict density limitations. The greater the allowable density, the lower the level of racial segregation.

Criticism

Environmental activists argue that putting everyday uses out of walking distance of each other leads to an increase in traffic, since people have to own cars in order to live a normal life where their basic human needs are met, and get in their cars and drive to meet their needs throughout the day. Single-use zoning and urban sprawl have also been criticized as making work–family balance more difficult to achieve, as greater distances need to be covered in order to integrate the different life domains. These issues are especially acute in the United States, with its high level of car usage combined with insufficient or poorly maintained urban rail and metro systems.

Euclidean zoning has been described as a functionalist way of thinking that uses mechanistic principles to conceive of the city as a fixed machine. This conception is in opposition to the view of the city as a continually evolving organism or living system, as first espoused by the German urbanist Hans Reichow.

Another avenue of criticism of zoning laws comes from libertarians and minarchists who see the restrictions as a violation of individuals' property rights. With zoning, a property owner may not be able to use her land for her desired purpose. Some economists claim that single-use zoning laws work against economic efficiency and hinder development in a free economy, as poor zoning restrictions hinder the more efficient usage of a given area. Even without zoning restrictions, a landfill, for example, would likely gravitate to cheaper land and not a residential area. Single-use zoning laws can get in the way of creative developments like mixed-use buildings and can even stop harmless activities like yard sales.

Other critics of zoning argue that zoning laws are a disincentive to provide housing which results in an increase in housing costs and a decrease in productive economic output. For example, A 2017 study showed that if all states deregulated their zoning laws only halfway to the level of Texas, a state known for low zoning regulations, their GDP would increase by 12 percent due to more productive workers and opportunity. Furthermore, critics note that it impedes the ability of those that wish to provide charitable housing from doing so. For example, in 2022, Gloversville's Free Methodist Church in New York wished to provide 40 beds for the homeless population in -4 degree weather and were inhibited from doing so. 

Some have argued that zoning laws increase economic inequality.

See also

 Activity centre
 Agricultural protection zoning
 Context theory
 Ekistics
 Exclusionary zoning
 Fenceline community
 Form-based codes
 Greenspace (disambiguation)
 Open space reserve
 Urban open space
 Inclusionary zoning
 Locally unwanted land use
 Mixed use development
 New urbanism
 NIMBY
 Non-conforming use
 Planning permission
 Police power
 Principles of Intelligent Urbanism
 Reverse sensitivity
 Road
 Single-use zoning
 Spot zoning
 Statutory planning
 Subdivision (land)
 Traffic
 Variance (land use)
 YIMBY
 Zoning district
 Zoning in the United States

References

Further reading
Taylor, George Town Planning for Australia (Studies in International Planning History), Routledge, 2018, .
Gurran, N., Gallent, N. and Chiu, R.L.H. Politics, Planning and Housing Supply in Australia, England and Hong Kong (Routledge Research in Planning and Urban Design), Routledge, 2016.
Bassett, E.M. The master plan, with a discussion of the theory of community land planning legislation. New York: Russell Sage foundation, 1938.
Bassett, E. M. Zoning. New York: Russell Sage Foundation, 1940
 Hirt, Sonia. Zoned in the USA: The Origins and Implications of American Land-Use Regulation (Cornell University Press, 2014) 245 pp. online review
 Stephani, Carl J. and Marilyn C. ZONING 101, originally published in 1993 by the National League of Cities, now available in a Third Edition, 2012.

External links
ZoningPoint – A searchable database of zoning maps and zoning codes for every county and municipality in the United States.
Crenex – Zoning Maps – Links to zoning maps and planning commissions of 50 most populous cities in the US.
 New York City Department of City Planning – Zoning History
 Schindler's Land Use Page (Michigan State University Extension Land Use Team)
 Zoning Compliance and Zoning Certification - Analysis and Reporting
 Land Policy Institute at Michigan State University
 By Bradley C. Karkkainen (1994). Zoning: A Reply To The Critics, Journal of Land Use & Environmental Law

 
Urban planning